A Sister of Six is a 1916 American silent Western film produced by the Fine Arts Film Company and distributed by Triangle Film Corporation. The film was directed by brothers Chester M. and Sidney Franklin. This was Bessie Love's first starring role.

The film is considered lost, as only a fragment survives.

Production 
The hacienda set was built on the Lasky Ranch.

Rehearsals for the film commenced on August 4, 1916.

Plot 
In 1860, Prudence (Love) and her six siblings are orphaned when their father is killed by bandits. Prudence becomes a surrogate mother to them, and moves the family from Southern California to New England to live with an old sailor uncle. When they learn that gold was discovered on their land in California, they all return to claim the gold by fighting the bandits who have taken over their land.

Cast

Release and reception 
On its release, it was shown with a Mack Sennett/Keystone comedy.

The film received generally positive reviews. The performances, especially those of the child actors, were praised as well. Despite positive reviews for Bessie Love's performance, it was noted that she was not yet a box office draw.

References

External links 

 
 
 
 
 Movie poster
 Photo of a dancing scene
 Film still with Francis Carpenter
 Film still of men on horseback

1916 films
1916 Western (genre) films
1916 lost films
American black-and-white films
Articles containing video clips
Films directed by Sidney Franklin
Films set in 1860
Films set in California
Films set in New England
Lost American films
Lost Western (genre) films
1916 drama films
Silent American Western (genre) films
1910s American films